The Portland Penny is the name subsequently given to a specific copper matron head one-cent coin, used to decide the name of Portland, Oregon, United States.

The City of Portland's two founders, Francis Pettygrove from Portland, Maine and Asa Lovejoy from Boston, Massachusetts, both wanted to name the fledgling site—then known as The Clearing—after their respective home towns. The coin toss was decided in 1845 with two out of three tosses which Pettygrove won.  The toss occurred in the parlor of the Ermatinger House, in Oregon City.  This house, the oldest in Clackamas County, is now a museum.  Portland was incorporated in 1851.

The coin, minted in 1835, was found in a safe deposit box left behind by Lovejoy and is now on display in the Oregon Historical Society Museum.

References 

History of Portland, Oregon
One-cent coins of the United States